Mihai Pătrașcu may refer to:

 Michael the Brave (or Mihai Viteazu), born Mihai Pătrașcu, prince of Wallachia and Romanian national hero
 Mihai Pătrașcu (computer scientist), Romanian-American computer scientist

See also
 Mihai Viteazu (disambiguation)